Bonanno Pisano (Pisa), active in the 1170s and 1180s, was an Italian sculptor, mixing Byzantine and classical elements. Giorgio Vasari attributed the realization of the Leaning Tower of Pisa to him in his Vite. Pisano was born in Pisa and worked there most of his life. In the 1180s, he departed for Monreale, in Sicily, where he completed the doors to the cathedral before returning to Pisa, where he died. Pisano was buried at the foot of the leaning tower, where his sarcophagus was discovered in 1820. Bonanno contributed to the Tower of Pisa in 1175, one year after the construction beginning. 

Between March 1179 and March 1180, he created the bronze Porta Reale of the cathedral of Pisa, which was destroyed in the 1595 fire.

The San Ranieri gate in Pisa

From 1186 on, he constructed the San Ranieri door, at the right transept of the Duomo, depicting the main episodes of the Life of Christ.

The gate of the cathedral of Monreale

Constructed between 1185 and 1186, the gate is signed Bonanno civis pisanus. It depicts five scenes of the Old Testament at the bottom, starting with Adam and Eve, and five scenes of the New Testament at the top, ending in "Christ and Mary in the glory of Paradise”

Joseph Bonanno ancestry

The Italian-American mafia boss, Joseph Bonanno is a descendant of Pisano, Bonanno was known to joke about the Leaning Tower of Pisa, saying that "even that was crooked".

Sources
Antonio Milone, '"Bonanno Pisano", in Artifex bonus, page 82–89, Roma-Bari 2004.

References

Gothic sculptors
12th-century Italian sculptors
Italian male sculptors